Rebeka Masarova was the defending champion, but chose not to participate.

Whitney Osuigwe won the title, defeating Claire Liu in the final, 6–4, 6–7(5–7), 6–3. Osuigwe became the first American to win the girls' singles title since Jennifer Capriati in 1989.

Seeds

Draw

Finals

Top half

Section 1

Section 2

Bottom half

Section 3

Section 4

Qualifying

Seeds

Qualifiers

Lucky losers

Draw

First qualifier

Second qualifier

Third qualifier

Fourth qualifier

Fifth qualifier

Sixth qualifier

Seventh qualifier

Eighth qualifier

External links 
 Draw

Girls' Singles
French Open, 2017 Girls' Singles